Clugnat is a commune in the Creuse department in the Nouvelle-Aquitaine region in central France.

Geography

Population

Sights
 The church of St. Martial, dating from the twelfth century.
 The modern chapel of St. John.
 The remains of the château de Bâtisse.
 An unusual war memorial.

See also
Communes of the Creuse department

References

Communes of Creuse